Peltzman is a surname.  Notable people with the surname include:

 Adam Peltzman, American television writer and producer
 Sam Peltzman (born 1940), American economist

See also
 Peltzman effect

Jewish surnames